The Roman Catholic Diocese of Gurué is a diocese located in the city of Gurué in the Ecclesiastical province of Beira in Mozambique.

History
 December 6, 1993: Established as the Diocese of Gurué from the Diocese of Quelimane

Leadership

 Bishops of Gurué (Latin Church)
 Manuel Chuanguira Machado (December 6, 1993 – October 9, 2009)
 Francisco Lerma Martínez (March 24, 2010 – April 24, 2019)
 Inácio Lucas (February 2, 2021 – present)

See also
Roman Catholicism in Mozambique

Sources
 GCatholic.org
 Catholic Hierarchy
 

Roman Catholic dioceses in Mozambique
Christian organizations established in 1993
Roman Catholic dioceses and prelatures established in the 20th century
1993 establishments in Mozambique
Roman Catholic Ecclesiastical Province of Nampula